This is a timeline of the history of the city of Cambridge, Massachusetts, United States.

17th century
 1630 - English settlers arrive. Site selected by John Winthrop the Younger.
 1632 - First Parish meeting house built.
 1636 - The "New College" founded.
 1636 - Newe Towne was established as a town in the Massachusetts Bay Colony on September 8. 
 1638
 Newe Towne renamed "Cambridge."
 John Harvard, a Puritan minister, bequeaths his library and half his monetary estate to the college.
 1639
 New College renamed Harvard College for benefactor John Harvard.
 First printing press in Cambridge.
 1640 - Bay Psalm Book printed.
 1642 - Harvard holds its first commencement.
 1662 - Great Bridge built.
 1663 - Algonquin-language Mamusse Wunneetupanatamwe Up-Biblum God published.
 1682 - Cooper-Frost-Austin House built (date approximate).
 1685 - Hooper-Lee-Nichols House built.
 1688 - Cambridge Village, later renamed Newton, separated from Cambridge.

18th century

 1713 - Town of Lexington separated from Cambridge.
 1720 - Harvard's Massachusetts Hall built.
 1727 - William Brattle House built.
 1759
 Christ Church congregation founded.
 Vassall House built.
 1760 - Apthorp House built.
 1767 - Elmwood (residence) built.
 1775
 April 18: William Dawes traverses the town en route to sounding warnings on eve of Battles of Lexington and Concord.
 April 19: Skirmishes between retreating British troops and American patriots at Watson's Corner and elsewhere in North Cambridge.
 May 12: The New-England Chronicle in publication.
 July 3: George Washington takes command of American army.
 1780 - May 19: New England's Dark Day.
 1782 - Harvard Medical School founded.
 1793 - West Boston Bridge built.
 1796 - Fresh Pond Hotel built.

19th century

1800s–1840s
 1800 - Printer William Hilliard in business.
 1805 - Harvard Botanic Garden founded.
 1807
 Cambridge and Concord Turnpike opens.
 Little Cambridge separates from Cambridge and is renamed Brighton.
 West Cambridge, later renamed Arlington, separated from Cambridge.
 1809
 Craigie's Bridge opens.
 Birth of Oliver Wendell Holmes Sr., physician, poet and polymath.
 1810 - Amicable Fire Society founded.
 1814 - Cambridge Humane Society and Female Humane Society founded.
 1815 - Harvard's University Hall built.
 1816 - Middlesex County Courthouse (Massachusetts) built.
 1817 - Harvard Law School founded.
 1818 - New England Glass Company established.
 1824 - East Cambridge Charitable Society formed.
 1826 - Frederic Tudor and Nathaniel Wyeth begin harvesting ice at Fresh Pond.
 1827 - First Evangelical Congregational church and Second Baptist Church established.
 1830 - Population: 6,072.
 1831
 Mount Auburn Cemetery founded.
 Cambridge Market Hotel (later Porter's Hotel) built.
 1832 - Cambridge Fire Department  and Cambridge Book Club established.
 1833
 Hunt & Co's Circulating Library in business.
 First Parish meeting house built, corner Church St. and Mass. Ave.
 1835 - West Cambridge Social Library active.

 1837
 August 31: Emerson gives "American Scholar" speech.
 East Cambridge Anti-Slavery Society formed.
 Henry Wadsworth Longfellow moves to Craigie House.
 1839
 Hopkins Classical School established.
 Harvard College Observatory founded.
 1840
 Cambridge Magnolia begins publication.
 St. John's Mutual Relief Society organized.
 Population: 8,409.
 1841 - Cambridge Lyceum organized.
 1846
 Cambridge Chronicle begins publication.
 Stickney-Shepard House built.
 Lexington and West Cambridge Railroad begins operating.
 Alvan Clark & Sons telescope maker in business.
 City chartered.
 James D. Green becomes mayor.
 Population: 12,500.
 1847 - Great Refractor telescope installed.
 1848 - Franklin Library Association founded.
 1849 - Cambridge Athenaeum incorporated.

1850s–1890s

 1850 - Howard Benevolent Society organized.
 1852
 Cambridge Water Works Corporation chartered.
 Riverside Press established.
 1854 - Cambridge Cemetery consecrated.
 1856 - Population: 20,473.
 1857
 Cambridge Circulating Library in business.
 Walden Street Cattle Pass built.
 1858 - Harvard Glee Club founded.
 1859 - Museum of Comparative Zoology founded.
 1860 - Cambridge Horticultural Society organized.
 1861 - Veterans' Services established.
 1862 - Sanitary Society active (approximate date).

 1865 - Old Cambridge Mutual Relief Society organized.
 1866
 Peabody Museum of Archaeology and Ethnology and New Church Theological School founded.
 Cambridge Press newspaper begins publication.
 1867 - Episcopal Theological School founded.
 1868 - Cambridge Mechanics Literary Association organized.

 1869
 Old Cambridge Baptist Church built on Harvard Street.
 North Cambridge Choral Society organized.
 1870 - Soldiers' Monument dedicated on Cambridge Common
 1871
 Cambridge Social Union founded.
 Alpha Glee Club organized.
 1872 - Cambridge Choral Society formed.

 1873
 The Harvard Crimson newspaper begins publication.
 Basket Club formed.
 1875
 Church of the Ascension organized.
 Kennedy Steam Bakery built.
 Population: 47,838.
 1876 - Harvard Lampoon begins publication.
 1877 - Harvard's Memorial Hall built.
 1878
 The Cambridge Tribune newspaper begins publication.
 Harvard's Sever Hall built.
 1879 - Cambridge Public Library established.
 1880 - Population: 52,669.
 1881 - Cambridge Club active.
 1882
 Society for the Collegiate Instruction of Women incorporated.
 Harvard Cooperative founded.
 1883
 Cambridge YMCA opens.
 Browne & Nichols School founded.
 1884 - Odd Fellows Hall built.
 1886 - Cambridge Hospital, Cambridge English High School (Broadway & Fayette St.), Cambridge Latin School (Lee St.), and Cambridge School for Girls established.
 1887 - Cambridgeport Cycle Club organized.

 1889
 City Hall, Brattle Hall, and William James' house built.
 Buckingham School founded.
 Cambridge Plant Club established.
 1890 - Population: 70,028.
 1891 - Harvard Bridge built.
 1892 - Old Cambridge Photographic Club formed.
 1893 - Road built around Fresh Pond.
 1894
 Radcliffe College chartered.
 Cambridge Walking Club founded.
 1895
 Lechmere Canal built.
 Keezer's clothier in business.
 W. E. B. Du Bois earns PhD from Harvard University.
 1896 - Cambridge Political Equality Association established.
 1897 -  Cambridge Skating Club founded.
 1900 - Population: 91,886.

20th century

1900s–1940s

 1901 - Swedenborg Chapel built.
 1903
 Cambridge Sentinel newspaper begins publication.
 Busch–Reisinger Museum opens.
 1904 - Harvard's Phillips Brooks House Association established.
 1905 - Cambridge Historical Society founded.
 1906 - Longfellow Bridge opens.
 1908
 Andover Theological Seminary relocates to city.
 Harvard's Business School established.
 1909 - Lesley School founded.
 1910
 Harvard Extension School founded.
 Harvard Square Business Association founded.
 Population: 104,839.
 1911 - Cambridge Housing Association formed.
 1912 - Kendall/MIT (MBTA station), Central (MBTA station), and Harvard (MBTA station) open.
 1913
 Harvard University Press and Harvard Legal Aid Bureau established.
 Cohen harness maker in business.
 1914 - Cambridge Planning Board established.
 1915
 Anderson Memorial Bridge and Harvard's Widener Library built.
 Cooperative Open Air School founded.
 1916
 Massachusetts Institute of Technology moves to Cambridge
 Tasty Sandwich Shop in business, a diner restaurant in Cambridge, open from 1916 to 1997 at 6 John F. Kennedy Street. Behind the counter is chef Don Valcovic,

 1917
 Wursthaus restaurant in business.
 Arthur D. Little Inc., Building constructed.
 1923 - Washington Elm dies on Cambridge Common.
 1924 - The Church of St. Paul (Harvard Square) built.
 1926 - Harvard Square Theater opens.
 1927
 John W. Weeks Bridge built.
 Necco factory opens on Massachusetts Avenue.
 Grolier Poetry Bookshop and Mac-Gray Corp. in business.
 1928 - Boston University Bridge built.
 1929 - Cambridge Community Center founded.
 1930
 First Church of Christ, Scientist built.
 Longy School of Music moves to Cambridge.
 Russian bells installed in Harvard's Lowell House.
 1932
 Harvard Book Store and MIT's Technology Press and School of Architecture established.
 Harvard's Memorial Church built.
 1936 - Harvard's Graduate School of Public Administration and Graduate School of Design established.
 1938
 Hayes-Bickford Cafeteria in business (approximate date).
 Harvard's Nieman Foundation for Journalism established.
 1940
 National Research Corporation in business.
 Cambridge citizens vote to adopt proportional representation for elections of its city council and school committee, with first use in 1941.

 1941
 Magazine of Cambridge begins publication.
 Harvard's Houghton Library built.
 1942 - John B. Atkinson becomes city manager.
 1945 - Cambridge Civic Unity Committee established.
1945 - Irving House established.
 1946 - WMIT begins broadcasting.
 1947
 September 9: Computer bug found at the Harvard Computation Lab.
 Demise of the Harvard Botanic Garden.
 Edgerton, Germeshausen, and Grier in business.

1950s–1970s

 1950
 Cardullo's Gourmet Shop in business.
 Joseph DeGuglielmo becomes mayor.
 1951
 Fresh Pond Drive-In opens.
 WHRB incorporated.
 1952
 John J. Curry becomes city manager.
 MIT School of Industrial Management and MIT Center for International Studies established.
 1953
 Brattle Theatre begins screening movies.
 Harvard Model United Nations conference begins.
 1954 - Wang Laboratories, Cheapo Records, and Hong Kong restaurant in business.

 1955
 Out of Town News, Casablanca bar, Elsie's eatery and Ferranti-Dege camera store in business.
 Smithsonian Astrophysical Observatory relocated to Cambridge.
 1957
 Cambridge Buddhist Association established.
 Pangloss Bookstore in business.
 1958
 Club 47 (music venue) opens.
 Joyce Chen restaurant and Chez Jean restaurant in business.
 Lisp (programming language) invented at MIT.
 Smoot measurement established.
 1959
 Café Pamplona in business.
 Harvard/MIT Center for Urban Studies and MIT Artificial Intelligence Laboratory established.
 1960
 Bartley's restaurant in business.
 Harvard's Let's Go travel guides begin publication.
 Out of Town News  opens in Harvard Square and goes to last sixty years selling newspapers from all over the world.
 1961

 Julia Child moves to Cambridge.
 October 14: Fire destroys the original WGBH television and radio studios, at MIT.
 1962
 Temple Beth Shalom founded.
 Fresh Pond Shopping Center built.
 Cambridge Electron Accelerator in operation.
 Harvard's Carpenter Center for the Visual Arts built.
 Cambridge Seven Associates in business.
 Cambridge Sports Union founded.
 1963 - Cambridge Historical Commission established.
 1964 - NASA Electronics Research Center established.
 1965 - Head of the Charles Regatta established.

 1966 - Cambridge School Volunteers founded.
 1967
 Joseph DeGuglielmo becomes city manager.
 Cambridge Forum, MIT's Center for Advanced Visual Studies established.
 1968
 Cambridge Housing Convention active.
 Shrdlu computer program developed at MIT.
 1969
 Murder of Jane Britton
 Student antiwar protest.
 Union of Concerned Scientists, and Harvard's Institute for African and African-American Research founded.
 Passim and Plough and Stars in business.
 1970
 The Middle East restaurant opens.
 Rent control and Massachusetts Department of Transportation Volpe Center established.
 Alfred Vellucci becomes mayor.
 1971
 Cambridge and Somerville Legal Services established.
 Grendel's Den pub in business.
 Revels performance series begins.
 1972
 Broadway Bicycle School in business.
 Longfellow National Historic Site and Cambridge Women's Center established.
 Harvard's Gund Hall built.
 October: Protest in East Cambridge against police conduct.
 1973
 Harvard–Smithsonian Center for Astrophysics established.
 Draper Laboratory active.
 T.T. the Bear's Place and Hacker's Haven car repair shop in business.
 1974
 Cambridge Food Co-op, city Arts Council, city Community Development Department, and Buckingham Browne & Nichols school established.
 James Sullivan becomes city manager.
 Cambridge Naturals  in business.
 1975 - Coffee Connection in business.
 1977
 Cambridge Rindge and Latin School formed.

 River Festival begins.
 Changsho restaurant in business.
 1978
 National Bureau of Economic Research active.
 Formaggio Kitchen in business.
 1979 - Harvard's Film Archive opens.

1980s–1990s

 1980
 American Repertory Theater and MIT's PiKa housing cooperative established.
 MIT Museum active.
 1981
 American Academy of Arts and Sciences moves to Cambridge.
 Cambridge College active.
 Robert W. Healy becomes city manager.
 Cambridge Center complex construction begins.
 1982
 Whitehead Institute for Biomedical Research founded.
 Biogen, Toscanini's, and Upstairs at the Pudding restaurant in business.
 Sister city relationships established with Coimbra, Portugal, and Gaeta, Italy.
 1983
 Harvard Square Homeless Shelter and Albert Einstein Institution established.
 Monitor Group and Cambridge Energy Research Associates headquartered in Cambridge.
 Sister city relationships established with Tsukuba Science City, Ibaraki, Japan; and Dublin, Ireland.
 Pegasystems Inc. and Forrester Research in business.
 Premiere of Marsha Norman's play Night, Mother.
 1984
 MIT Media Lab, Institute for Resource and Security Studies, and city Police Review & Advisory Board established.
 Sister city relationship established with Ischia, Italy.
 Porter MBTA Red Line station opens.
 Conflict Management Group headquartered in city.
 Thinking Machines Corporation and Charles Hotel in business.

 1985
 Alewife (MBTA station) opens.
 Harvard's Arthur M. Sackler Museum built.
 Dante Alighieri Society building inaugurated.
 Memorial Drive partially pedestrianized along Riverbend Park.
 1986
 Garment District (clothing retailer) in business.
 Thinking Machines' Connection Machine invented.
 MIT flea market begins.
 1987
 Sister city relationships established with Yerevan, Armenia; San José Las Flores, Chalatenango, El Salvador; and Catania, Italy.
 Cambridge becomes a Peace Messenger City.
 Catch a Rising Star in business.
 Joseph P. Kennedy II becomes U.S. representative for Massachusetts's 8th congressional district.
 1988 - Cambridge Community Television and Cambridge Eviction Free Zone established.
 1989
 Cambridge Sane/Freeze active.
 Sister city relationship established with Kraków, Poland.
 1990
 CambridgeSide Galleria built.

 Sapient Corporation in business.
 1991
 City Bicycle Committee and Ig Nobel Prize established.
 MÄK Technologies in business.
 1992
 Boston Dynamics (robotics firm) and Dewey, Cheetham & Howe in business.
 Kenneth Reeves becomes mayor.
 Sister city relationship established with Florence, Italy.

 1993
 City master plan published.
 MIT's The Tech newspaper web edition begins publication.
 Timothy J. Toomey, Jr. becomes state representative for 29th Middlesex district.
 1994
 Islamic Society of Boston mosque opens.
 Rialto restaurant in business.
 1995
 Kendall Square Cinema opens.
 Porter Square Neighbors Association formed.
 Cybersmith and Phoenix Landing (music venue) in business.
 1996
 Cambridge Health Alliance and On The Rise nonprofit established.
 City Dance Party begins.
 Sheila Russell becomes mayor.
 1997
 City website online.
 Cambridge Civic Journal begins publication.
 Sister city relationship established with Galway, Ireland.
 French-American International School active.

 1998
 Akamai Technologies in business.
 MIT's Center for Reflective Community Practice active.
 Francis Duehay becomes mayor.
 Harvard's Berkman Center for Internet & Society founded.
 1999
 Cambridge Innovation Center in business.
 Mike Capuano becomes U.S. representative for Massachusetts's 8th congressional district.

21st century
 2000
 Zipcar in business.
 Anthony Galluccio becomes mayor.
 MIT's Kismet (robot) introduced.
 2001
New water treatment plant at Fresh Pond opens.
 2002 - Michael A. Sullivan becomes mayor.
 2003
 Novartis research division headquartered in city.
 Longwood Players (theatre group) active.
 MIT's Poverty Action Lab and Harvard's Ash Institute for Democratic Governance and Innovation founded.
 Sister city relationship established with Santo Domingo Oeste, Dominican Republic.

 2004
 Broad Institute, Community Charter School of Cambridge, and ActBlue (nonprofit) established.
 MIT's Stata Center built.
 Sister city relationship established with Southwark, London, England.
 February 4: Facebook launched at Harvard College.
 2005
 Sister city relationships established with Cienfuegos, Cuba; Yuseong, Daejeon, Korea; and Haidian, Beijing, China.
 Cambridge Day begins publication.
 Patricia D. Jehlen becomes state senator for 2nd Middlesex district.
 2006
 Green Decade Cambridge incorporated.
 Kenneth Reeves becomes mayor again.
 Harvard's Rappaport Institute for Greater Boston established.
 HubSpot in business.

 2007
 Microsoft New England Research & Development Center opens.
 Cambridge Science Festival begins.
 MIT's Center for Future Civic Media established.
 Unitarian Universalist Service Committee headquartered in Cambridge.
 Anthony Petruccelli becomes state senator for 1st Suffolk and Middlesex district.
 2008
 Alliance of Cambridge Tenants, and Google Inc. branch established.
 ImprovBoston moves to Cambridge.
 Harvard Square Library incorporated.
 E. Denise Simmons becomes mayor.
 ROFLCon meme convention begins.
 Central Square Theater built.
 Jon Hecht elected state representative for 29th Middlesex district.
 2009
 July: Henry Louis Gates arrest controversy
 West Cambridge Youth and Community Center opens.
 Kendall Square Association established.
 Cambridge Open Studios active.
 Trader Joe's grocery in business at Fresh Pond.
 2010
 David Maher becomes mayor.
 Population: 105,162; metro 4,552,402.
 Sal DiDomenico becomes state senator for Middlesex, Suffolk and Essex district.
 2011
 January 6: Aaron Swartz arrested.
 Area Four restaurant, Veggie Galaxy restaurant  and Danger!awesome in business.
 2012
 MIT/Harvard edX launched.
 Henrietta Davis becomes mayor.
 Hack/reduce nonprofit founded.
 Sinclair and Amazon office in business.
 2013
 Richard Rossi becomes city manager.
 Cambridge Open Data Ordinance drafted.
 Cambridge Happenings in publication.
 April 18–19: MIT officer killed; manhunt for Boston Marathon bombing suspects takes place.
 November: Municipal election.
 December: Katherine Clark  becomes U.S. representative for Massachusetts's 5th congressional district.
 Marjorie Decker becomes state representative for 25th Middlesex district, Dave Rogers becomes state representative for 24th Middlesex district, and Jay Livingstone becomes state representative for 8th Suffolk district.
 2014
 City open data portal launched.
 H Mart grocery and Alden & Harlow restaurant in business.
 David Maher becomes mayor again.
 2015
 January 2015 North American blizzard.
 September 6: Lawrence Lessig presidential campaign, 2016 headquartered in city.
 December 3: Fire.

See also
 Cambridge, Massachusetts history section
 List of mayors of Cambridge, Massachusetts
 National Register of Historic Places listings in Cambridge, Massachusetts
 List of National Historic Landmarks in Massachusetts, Cambridge section
 History of the Massachusetts Institute of Technology
 History of Harvard University
 Timelines of other municipalities in Middlesex County, Massachusetts: Lowell, Somerville, Waltham

References

Bibliography

Published in the 19th century
1800s-1840s
 
 
 
 
 
 1848-1894
 1901-1921
 2003-present
 

1850s-1870s
 
 
 
 
 
  1886 ed.
 . 1875-
 
 
 1875, 1876, 1878, 1879
 1880, 1889
 1890, 1899
 1900, 1909
 
 

1880s-1890s
 
 
 
 George F. Crook, ed. Cambridge annual for 1886-1888.
 
 
  1894- . 1890s
 . 1894?

Published in the 20th century
 
 
  1916 ed.
 
 
 
 
 
 
 
 
  + Chronology
 
  1995- 2004-present
  (Timeline of boundary changes)

Published in the 21st century

External links

  1960s-2000
 
  (map)
 
 Items related to Cambridge, various dates (via Digital Public Library of America).
 
 Cambridge Soldiers and Sailors Monument at the Massachusetts Civil War Monuments Project

Images

 
Timeline
cambridge